Lachesilla rossica is a rare psocopteran species described from southern Russia. The species can be found in Ukraine as well. It has been found recently in the valley of the Allondon river, near Geneva, Switzerland. In the latter habitat, it is found together with Lachesilla bernardi, a congeneric species that is visually very similar to it: the examination of genitalia with a microscope is the only way to differentiate the two species.

References

Lachesillidae
Insects described in 1953
Psocoptera of Europe